Anne Golon (17 December 1921 – 14 July 2017) was a French author, better known to English-speaking readers as Sergeanne Golon. Her Angélique novels have reportedly sold 150 million copies worldwide and have inspired multiple adaptations.

Biography
Anne Golon was born as Simone Changeux on 17 December 1921 in Toulon, a port in south-eastern France. She was the daughter of Pierre Changeux, a scientist and a captain in the French Navy. She was interested in painting and writing from early childhood and published her first novel, The Country From Behind My Eyes, when she was 18 under the pen name Joëlle Danterne. During World War II, she travelled via bicycle through France to Spain. She wrote using different pen names, helped create France Magazine, and was awarded a literary prize for The Patrol of the Saint Innocents.

She was sent to Africa as a journalist, where, in 1947, she met her future husband, Vsevolod Sergeïvich Goloubinoff, better known as Serge Golon. They collaborated on Angélique: Marquise of the Angels (1956), the first installment in the Angélique series. The novel was an overnight success. When originally published in France, the Angélique novels were credited to both Anne and Serge Golon – Anne being the author and Serge having done much of the historical research. The two names were later combined as "Sergeanne Golon" by British publishers when the series was translated into English.

The popularity of the Angélique novels led to a series of five feature films directed by Bernard Borderie in the 1960s. The actress Michèle Mercier played Angélique, and Robert Hossein played her husband, Joffrey de Peyrac.

In 1972, Anne and Serge travelled to Canada to research a new Angélique novel. That year, as Anne wrote Angélique and the Ghosts, Serge died.

Anne carried on writing and brought up her four children at the same time. Between Serge's death in 1972 and 1985, Anne wrote four more volumes, beginning with the second half of Ghosts (published in France as a single volume, Angélique in Quebec) and proceeding through .

By the 1990s, Anne was reduced to a state close to poverty and filed a lawsuit against the French publisher Hachette for abuse of copyright and unpaid royalties. In 2006, after a legal battle lasting nearly a decade, she reached an agreement which left her the sole owner of the Angélique series.

On 14 July 2017, she died from peritonitis in Versailles, France.

Publications

 Angélique: Marquise of the Angels (1957)
 Angélique: The Road to Versailles (1958)
 Angélique and the King (1959)
 Angélique and the Sultan (1960)
 Angélique in Revolt (1961)
 Angélique in Love (1961)
 The Countess Angélique (1964)
 The Temptation of Angélique (1966)
 Angélique and the Demon (1972)
 Angélique and the Ghosts (1976)
  (1980)
  (1984)
  (1985)

Notes

References

External links
 The official website for the Angélique series
 A 2013 press kit featuring an interview with Anne Golon
 A 2018 article from BFM TV documenting Anne Golon's legal battle with Hachette 

1921 births
2017 deaths
French historical novelists
Writers from Toulon
Women historical novelists
20th-century French novelists
21st-century French novelists
20th-century French women writers
21st-century French women writers
French romantic fiction writers